Edwardsiella ictaluri (also known as  enteric septicaemia of catfish, hole in the head disease, and ESC) is a member of the family Hafniaceae. The bacterium is a short, gram negative, pleomorphic rod with flagella. It causes the disease enteric septicaemia of catfish (ESC), which infects a variety of fish species (including many catfish species, knifefish and barbs). The bacteria can cause either acute septicaemia or chronic encephalitis in infected fish. Outbreaks normally occur in spring and autumn.

Edwardsiella ictaluri can be found in Asia and the United States, being of particular economic importance in the U.S. It is not a zoonosis.

Clinical signs and diagnosis
Acute ESC infection causes an acute septicaemia that presents as multiple petechial haemorrhages that develop into depigmented ulcers. Additional clinical signs include abnormal behavior, exophthalmos, hemorrhagic gastroenteritis, edema and ascites. Chronic ESC infection causes a chronic encephalitis. Clinical signs include abnormal behavior, abnormal swimming patterns, swelling and ulceration of the head and death.

Any fish that survive the infection become latent carriers of the disease.

A presumptive diagnosis can be made based on the clinical signs alone but PCR, indirect immunofluorescence, bacterial culture and ELISA can be used to definitively diagnose the disease.

Treatment and control
Several antibiotics can be used to treat the disease, but there are reports of resistance emerging. Vaccination can be used to prevent disease. Management factors such as reducing stocking density and stress should be considered.

See also
 Edwardsiella
 Enterobacterales
 Edwardsiella tarda
 Head and lateral line erosion

References

Edwardsiella ictaluri, reviewed and published by Wikivet at http://en.wikivet.net/Edwardsiella_ictaluri, accessed 06/09/2011.

External links
Type strain of Edwardsiella ictaluri at BacDive -  the Bacterial Diversity Metadatabase

Enterobacterales
Bacterial diseases of fish
Bacteria described in 1962